ETV Bal Bharat is a children's pay television channel owned by the Hyderabad-based ETV Network airing animated programming. The channel was launched on 27 April 2021, initially with twelve language audio tracks. 

Bal Bharat is the network's first television channel dedicated to children, and is the only one to include audio tracks in multiple languages, including eleven Indian ones and even English. However, it was announced that the Punjabi, Odia, Gujarati, Marathi, Bengali, and Assamese regional channels of Bal Bharat would cease operations by 1 April 2022, leaving their audio feeds to remain with the other six languages on the main channel.

Programming

See also
ETV Network
Ramoji Group
Eenadu

References

Children's television channels in India
Television stations in Hyderabad
Television channels and stations established in 2021
Ramoji Group
ETV Network

External links